Paul Kinnerk (born 12 December 1985) is an Irish hurling coach and Gaelic footballer who plays as a midfielder at senior level for the Limerick county team.

Playing career
Born in Monaleen, County Limerick, Kinnerk first played competitive hurling whilst at school in Ardscoil Rís. He arrived on the inter-county scene at the age of twenty when he first linked up with the Limerick under-21 team. He made his senior debut in the 2011 championship.  Kinnerk went on to play a cameo role for Limerick over the following few seasons.

At club level he has won five championship medals (2001, 2005, 2010, 2011, 2016) with Monaleen.

Managerial career
Kinnerk has also been heavily involved in team management and coaching, with his first involvement in senior inter-county hurling being with the Clare county team. Over a number of years he served as coach and selector to the Clare minor, under-21 and senior hurling teams. In his time with as a coach with the Clare minor hurlers, the team won successive (2010, 2011) Munster titles. The following three years (2012 - 2014) saw him serve as both coach to the Clare U21 and Clare senior team; roles he fulfilled while also playing senior inter-county football with his native county Limerick. The Clare U21 teams were undefeated during this period, winning three munster and three all-Ireland titles. Under his guidance, the senior team won the 2013 All-Ireland Senior Hurling Championship title. 

In 2017, Kinnerk took up a role as coach to the Limerick senior hurling team. In the following season, Limerick won the 2018 All-Ireland Senior Hurling Championship for the first time since 1973. Under Kinnerk's guidance, the team would go on to win another All-Ireland SHC title in 2020, along with two Munster SHC titles (2019, 2020) and two National League titles (2019, 2020).

References

1985 births
Living people
Clare county hurling team
Hurling coaches
Hurling selectors
Irish schoolteachers
Limerick county hurling team
Monaleen Gaelic footballers
Limerick inter-county Gaelic footballers
Monaleen hurlers